Communauté d'agglomération du Cotentin is the communauté d'agglomération, an intercommunal structure, centred on the city of Cherbourg-en-Cotentin, on the Cotentin Peninsula. It is located in the Manche department, in the Normandy region, northwestern France. It was created in January 2017 by the merger of 9 communautés de communes and the 2 new communes Cherbourg-en-Cotentin and La Hague. Its area is 1439.4 km2. Its population was 179,484 in 2018, of which 79,144 in Cherbourg-en-Cotentin proper.

Composition
The communauté d'agglomération consists of the following 129 communes:

Anneville-en-Saire
Aumeville-Lestre
Azeville
Barfleur
Barneville-Carteret
Baubigny
Benoîtville
Besneville
Biniville
La Bonneville
Bretteville
Breuville
Bricquebec-en-Cotentin
Bricquebosq
Brillevast
Brix
Canteloup
Canville-la-Rocque
Carneville
Catteville
Cherbourg-en-Cotentin
Clitourps
Colomby
Couville
Crasville
Crosville-sur-Douve
Digosville
Écausseville
Émondeville
Éroudeville
L'Étang-Bertrand
Fermanville
Fierville-les-Mines
Flamanville
Flottemanville
Fontenay-sur-Mer
Fresville
Gatteville-le-Phare
Golleville
Gonneville-le-Theil
Grosville
La Hague
Le Ham
Hardinvast
Hautteville-Bocage
La Haye-d'Ectot
Héauville
Helleville
Hémevez
Huberville
Joganville
Lestre
Lieusaint
Magneville
Martinvast
Maupertus-sur-Mer
Le Mesnil
Le Mesnil-au-Val
Les Moitiers-d'Allonne
Montaigu-la-Brisette
Montebourg
Montfarville
Morville
Négreville
Néhou
Neuville-en-Beaumont
Nouainville
Octeville-l'Avenel
Orglandes
Ozeville
La Pernelle
Pierreville
Les Pieux
Port-Bail-sur-Mer
Quettehou
Quinéville
Rauville-la-Bigot
Rauville-la-Place
Reigneville-Bocage
Réville
Rocheville
Le Rozel
Saint-Christophe-du-Foc
Saint-Cyr
Sainte-Colombe
Sainte-Geneviève
Saint-Floxel
Saint-Georges-de-la-Rivière
Saint-Germain-de-Tournebut
Saint-Germain-le-Gaillard
Saint-Jacques-de-Néhou
Saint-Jean-de-la-Rivière
Saint-Joseph
Saint-Marcouf
Saint-Martin-d'Audouville
Saint-Martin-le-Gréard
Saint-Maurice-en-Cotentin
Saint-Pierre-d'Arthéglise
Saint-Pierre-Église
Saint-Sauveur-le-Vicomte
Saint-Vaast-la-Hougue
Saussemesnil
Sénoville
Sideville
Siouville-Hague
Sortosville
Sortosville-en-Beaumont
Sottevast
Sotteville
Surtainville
Taillepied
Tamerville
Teurthéville-Bocage
Teurthéville-Hague
Théville
Tocqueville
Tollevast
Tréauville
Urville
Valcanville
Valognes
Varouville
Le Vast
Vaudreville
Le Vicel
Vicq-sur-Mer
Videcosville
Virandeville
Yvetot-Bocage

References

Cotentin
Cotentin